Mark van der Schoot (born 4 October 1990), known by his stage name Maduk, is a Dutch drum and bass music producer and DJ from Amsterdam. He has released music on Hospital Records, Liquicity Records, Viper Recordings as well as Monstercat and Fokuz Recordings. He released his first album Never Give Up at Hospital Records on 29 April 2016. Together with Maris Goudzwaard, he founded Liquicity.

History
He won the award for "Best Newcomer Producer" at the Drum and Bass Awards 2014, and the "Best Newcomer DJ" award in 2015.

Discography

Albums

Extended plays

References

External links
 Maduk at Hospital Records
 
 

1990 births
Living people
Dutch DJs
Dutch drum and bass musicians
Hospital Records artists
Musicians from Amsterdam
Electronic dance music DJs